St John or St. John is a given name and surname. It can be pronounced  or  sometimes in some places, particularly if it is the first part of a hyphenated family name or a given name. Use of the full stop separator (period) is uncommon in some countries, especially those that use Commonwealth English.

People with the given name 
St John Ellis (1964–2005), British Rugby League player
St John Ervine, Irish writer
Oliver St. John Gogarty, Irish doctor, poet, author, and politician
St John Groser, Anglican priest and Christian socialist
St John Hornby (1867–1946), British businessman
St John Horsfall, British motor racing driver
St John O'Neill (1741–1790), Irish MP for Randalstown
Saint-John Perse, pseudonym of Alexis Leger (1887–1975), French poet and diplomat
St John Philby (1885–1960), British civil servant and explorer in Arabia

Fictional characters with the given name 

St. John Allerdyce, real name of Pyro, fictional supervillain
St John Colchester, in the Torchwood audio drama series
St. John Hawke, in the American TV series Airwolf
St. John Quartermaine, in Quartermaine's Terms, the play by Simon Gray
St. John Rivers, clergyman in Charlotte Brontë's Jane Eyre
St. John Talbot, in the film Star Trek V: The Final Frontier
St. John Powell, partner of fictional advertising firm Putnam, Powell and Lowe in American TV series Mad Men
James St. John Smythe, alias used by fictional spy James Bond whilst posing as a horse buyer in A View to a Kill
St. John Gurney-Clifford, in British TV series Grantchester

People with the surname 

Alex St. John, American programmer
Al St. John, American comic actor
Ambrose St. John (1815–1875), English priest and convert to Catholicism
Andrew St. John, American actor
Annie St John, British television presenter
Archer St. John (1904–1955), American comic book publisher
Austin St. John, American actor
Bayle St. John, British writer
Bert St. John, Australian tennis player
Betta St. John, American actress
Beverly St. John, American church elder
Bridget St John, British singer
Caroline St John-Brooks, English journalist
Charles St. John, 19th-century U.S. Representative from New York
Charles Edward St. John (1857–1935), American astronomer
Cheryl St.John, American author
Cornelia Laws St. John (died 1902), American poet 
Cynthia Morgan St. John (1852–1919), American Wordsworthian, book collector, and author
Daniel B. St. John, 19th-century U.S. Representative from New York
Dai St. John, Welsh heavyweight boxer
David St. John, American poet
Del St. John, Canadian hockey player
Douglas St. John, New Zealand cricketer
Earl St. John, American-born producer
Edward St John (1916–1994), Australian politician
Florence St. John, English actress and singer
Frederick St John, 2nd Viscount Bolingbroke
George St John, 3rd Viscount Bolingbroke
Gina St. John, American actress
Harold St. John, American botanist
Harold Bernard St. John, Barbadian politician
Helen St. John, American musician
Henry St John, 1st Viscount Bolingbroke (1678–1751), English statesman and philosopher
Henry St. John (congressman), 19th-century U.S. Representative from Ohio
Henry Beauchamp St John, British Army officer
Howard St. John, American actor
Ian St John (1938–2021), Scottish footballer, manager and pundit
Isaac M. St. John (1827–1880), Confederate States Army brigadier general during the American Civil War
J. Allen St. John, American author, artist and illustrator
James Augustus St. John (1795–1875), British author and traveller
Jane Martha St. John (1801–1882), British amateur photographer
Jill St. John, American film and television actress
John St. John (disambiguation), several people
Jon St. John, American voice actor and singer 
Joseph St. John, Canadian politician
Jude St. John, Canadian football league player
Julia St. John, English actress
Kate St John, British musician and composer
Kristoff St. John, American actor
Lara St. John, Canadian violinist
Locke St. John, American baseball player
Lynn St. John, American sports coach
Madeleine St John, Australian author
Marco St. John, American actor
Mark St. John, American guitarist
Mary Louise St. John, American nun
Mia St. John, American boxer
Norman St John-Stevas, Baron St John of Fawsley, British politician
Oliver St John (ca. 1598–1673), English statesman and judge
Oliver St John (civil servant), British administrator of India
Pat St. John, American DJ
Patricia St. John, British writer
Pete St. John, Irish singer
Powell St. John, American singer and songwriter
Ray St. John, British musician
Richard Fleming St Andrew St John (1839–1919), English orientalist
Robert St. John (1902–2003), American author, broadcaster, and journalist
Scott St. John, Canadian musician
Sharmagne Leland-St. John, Native American poet
Spenser St. John, British Consul in Brunei (19th century)
Trevor St. John, American actor
Warren St. John, American author

Baronets of Lydiard Tregoze (1611)
Sir John St John, 1st Baronet (1585–1648), Member of Parliament and prominent Royalist

Barons St John of Bletso (1559)

John St John, 2nd Baron St John of Bletso (died 1596)
Oliver St John, 5th Baron St John of Bletso
Oliver St John, 1st Earl of Bolingbroke (1580?–1646), known from 1618 until 1624 as 4th Baron St John of Bletso, English nobleman and politician
Paulet St Andrew St John, 8th Baron St John of Bletso
John St John, 11th Baron St John of Bletso (died 1757)
John St John, 12th Baron St John of Bletso (died 1767)
St Andrew St John, 14th Baron St John of Bletso
St Andrew St John, 15th Baron St John of Bletso
Beauchamp St John, 17th Baron St John of Bletso
Mowbray St John, 19th Baron St John of Bletso
John St John, 20th Baron St John of Bletso (1917–1976)
Anthony St John, 22nd Baron St John of Bletso

Fictional characters with the surname 
Alexandria St. John, in the American TV series The Vampire Diaries
Dalton St. John, in the American TV series The Vampire Diaries
Deacon St. John, protagonist in the video game Days Gone
Mick St. John, one of the main characters in the American TV series Moonlight
Peter St. John (Mandala), in the British comic book series Zenith
Lorenzo St. John, a vampire in the American TV series The Vampire Diaries
Virginia St. John, in the American TV series The Vampire Diaries

See also
 
Matthias Sention, Sr. (1603–1669), founding settler of Norwalk, Connecticut and ancestor of many people with the surname St. John in America
St John-Mildmay Baronets
St John Baronets, of Northwood (1660)
Viscount Bolingbroke

St John family